or  is an island in Kvænangen Municipality in Troms og Finnmark county, Norway. The island has a population (2021) of 23 people, with everyone living along the southern coast. The only access to the island is by boat. The population has been declining over time. The main economic activities on the island center around the production of Boknafisk as well as tourism.

See also
List of islands of Norway

References

Kvænangen
Islands of Troms og Finnmark